The Light the Fuse Tour is the eighth headlining concert tour by New Zealand born-Australian country music singer Keith Urban, in support of his eighth studio album Fuse (2013). This is the first headlining amphitheater tour for Urban, playing in over seventy cities across the United States and Canada. The tour also traveled to Australia. It began on 18 July 2013 and finished on 29 June 2014.

Background
The Light the Fuse Tour was first announced on 25 March 2013. Even though the new record will not be out before the tour begins Urban promises to play songs off it. The tour began on 18 July 2013, in Cincinnati,  the second leg began on 18 October 2013, in Omaha. Additional dates were announced on 22 August 2013. The third North American leg began on 9 January 2014, and lasted until 1 February. Urban embarked on the Australian leg on 4 June, and the tour concluded on 29 June.

Opening acts
Little Big Town (North America)
Dustin Lynch (North America)
Sheppard (Australia)

Setlist

"Long Hot Summer"
"Sweet Thing"
"I Told You So"
"Stupid Boy"
"Even the Stars Fall For You"
"You Gonna Fly"
"Without You"
"Kiss a Girl"
"Won't Get Fooled Again" Intro (The Who cover)
"Days Go By"
"Rumour Has It" (Adele cover)
"Making Memories of Us"
"Better Life"
"You'll Think of Me"
"Who Wouldn't Wanna Be Me"
"Locked Out of Heaven"  (Bruno Mars cover/Snippet, sung by Brian Nutter))
"Somebody Like You"
Encore
"Tonight I Wanna Cry"
"You Look Good in My Shirt"

Notes
"Good Thing" in Louisville.

Tour dates

Festivals and other miscellaneous performances
This concert is a part of the Country Thunder.
This concert is a part of the Great Jones County Fair.
This concert is Urban with Little Big Town only.

Box office score data

Critical reception
Chuck Dauphin of Billboard (magazine) says, Urban "proved why he is held in such high esteem by critics and fans alike. The singer delivered one of the strongest performances of any country artist this year—or the past few years for that matter."

References

External links

2013 concert tours
2014 concert tours
Keith Urban concert tours